Charles Sutherland may refer to:

Charles Sutherland (footballer)
Charles Sutherland (Surgeon General)
Charles D. Sutherland, architect